Les Burnell Jepsen (born June 24, 1967) is a retired American professional basketball player who played in the National Basketball Association (NBA) during the early 1990s.

A 7'0" center, Jepsen played at Bowbells High School in North Dakota and at The University of Iowa. He was part of George Raveling's recruiting class at The University of Iowa in 1985 which included B. J. Armstrong, Roy Marble, Ed Horton and Kevin Gamble. All five recruits went on to play in the NBA.

Jepsen was selected 28th overall in the 1990 NBA draft by the Golden State Warriors where he played the 1990–91 season under Don Nelson before being traded along with Mitch Richmond to the Sacramento Kings for Billy Owens on November 1, 1991 (shortly before the opening day of the 1991–92 season).

As a member of a touring team ("Footlocker Allstars"), Jepsen played in Europe in 1997. In the 1997-98 season, he played for the Newcastle Eagles in England and for New Wave Göteborg in Sweden.

References

External links
Les Jepsen - Hawkeye Sports News
Les Jepsen interview @ thedraftreview.com
College & NBA stats @ basketballreference.com
Les Jepsen interview @ dailyiowan.com
Recent photo of Les Jepsen @ www.jepsenconsulting.com

1967 births
Living people
American men's basketball players
Basketball players from North Dakota
Centers (basketball)
Fargo-Moorhead Fever players
Golden State Warriors draft picks
Golden State Warriors players
Hartford Hellcats players
Iowa Hawkeyes men's basketball players
People from Burke County, North Dakota
Rockford Lightning players
Sacramento Kings players